Moonlight and Roses is an album recorded by Jim Reeves and released in 1964 on the RCA Victor label (catalog no. SF-7639). Chet Atkins was the producer. It was Reeves' first album to reach the No. 1 spot on the Billboard country albums chart.

Track listing
Side A
 "Moonlight And Roses (Bring Mem'ries Of You)" (Black, Moret) [2:24]
 "Mexicali Rose" (Stone, Tenney) [2:26]
 "Carolina Moon" (Benny Davis, Joe Burke) [2:28]
 "Rosa Rio" (Cindy Walker) [2:53]
 "Oh What It Seemed To Be" (Benjamin, Carle, Weiss) [2:52]
 "What's In It For Me" (Cindy Walker) [2:26]

Side B
 "Roses" (Glenn Spencer, Tim Spencer) [2:28]
 "One Dozen Roses" (Jurgens, Washburn, Lewis, Donovan) [1:50]
 "Moon River" (Mancini, Mercer) [2:27]
 "There's A New Moon Over My Shoulder" (Davis, Blastic) [2:37]
 "It's Only A Paper Moon" (Rose, Harburg, Arlen) [2:21]
 "When I Lost You" (Irving Berlin) [2:29]

See also
 Jim Reeves discography

References

1964 albums
Jim Reeves albums